Auffray or Aufray is a surname, and may refer to;

 André Auffray (1884–1953), French racing cyclist
 Charles Auffray (born 1973), French tennis player
 Guy Auffray (1945–2021), French judoka
 Hugues Aufray (born 1929), French singer-songwriter and guitarist
 Marie-Thérèse Auffray (1912–1990), French painter and member of the French Resistance during World War II

See also
 Auffret

Surnames of Norman origin
Surnames of Breton origin
Germanic-language surnames